The Critics' Choice Prize was a New Zealand Music Awards prize awarded to New Zealand musical artists who were expected to be successful in the music industry in the future. To be eligible for the award, an artist must have neither released a studio album nor have been nominated for a New Zealand Music Award in the past.

The prize was judged by a panel of 13 music-industry critics. The winner was decided at a live event held at the Kings Arms tavern in Auckland. Each of the three shortlisted artists performs, then the judges deliberated and the prize was presented. The prize included a $10,000 NZ On Air grant and mentoring from industry professionals. The prize was first awarded in 2010 to Street Chant and last awarded in 2016 to Scuba Diva. In 2017, Recorded Music New Zealand confirmed that the Critic's Choice Prize would not be awarded that year and the award would be reevaluated.

Recipients

References

Awards established in 2010
Critics' Choice Prize
2010 establishments in New Zealand